Geetha is a 2019 Indian Kannada action drama film written and directed by debutant Vijay Naagendra starring Ganesh, Shanvi Srivastava and Prayaga Martin in lead roles. Anup Rubens handle the music for the movie. The film derives its name from 1981 Kannada classic Geetha directed by Shankar Nag, however, the film team has clarified the content is very different and revolves around the famous Gokak Agitation.

Plot 
Set against the backdrop of the Gokak Chaluvali (the language rights agitation in the 1980s in Karnataka), this movie tells the story of Akash and Geetha whose paths keep crossing as they bump into each other at different stages of their lives.

Cast 

 Ganesh as Aakaash and younger Shankar 
 Devaraj as elder Shankar
 Shanvi Srivastava as Priya and younger Aarthi
 Swathi as elder Aarthi
 Prayaga Martin as Geethanjali 
Parvathy Arun as younger Geethanjali
 Sudharani as elder Geethanjali
 Rangayana Raghu as Photo Raja
 Achyuth Kumar as Geetha's father
 Ravishankar Gowda as Ramesha
 Vishal Hegde as Prem
 Ravi Bhat as Priya's father
 Vihaan Ganesh as Aakaash
 K S Shridhar as Geethanjali's Father
 Bala Rajwadi as a cop

Production 
The film is a joint venture of Syed Salam Films and Ganesh's home banner Golden Movies. The movie is shot in Kolkata, Manali and Bangalore.

Soundtrack 

The film's score and soundtrack is composed by Anup Rubens. The music rights are acquired by Anand Audio.

References

External links 
 

2019 films
2010s Kannada-language films
2019 action drama films
Indian action drama films
2019 directorial debut films
Films shot in Kolkata
Films shot in Bangalore

kn:ಗೀತಾ